Kegham Mihran Atmadjian (literary pseudonym Sema, November 18, 1910 – May 18, 1940) was a French-Armenian poet and editor.

Biography
Being a survivor of the Armenian genocide, Atmadjian lived in orphanages in Turkey and Aleppo. In 1929 he moved to Paris, where he published the Armenian cultural magazine "Jank" (Effort), together with Missak Manouchian. In 1935–1937 he published another Armenian magazine, "Mshaguyt" (Culture), with Bedros Zaroyan. He was the author of poems, plays, short stories, and articles. In 1940 he was killed during his service in the French army at the outbreak of World War II. His sister Marie Atmadjian, a poet by herself, wrote memoirs about him.

External links
 Sema

1910 births
1940 deaths
People from Bafra
20th-century French male writers
Armenian male poets
French male poets
20th-century Armenian poets
20th-century French poets
French people of Armenian descent
Armenians from the Ottoman Empire
Armenian genocide survivors
French military personnel killed in World War II
Syrian emigrants to France
French Army personnel of World War II